Digri is a Tehsil in Mirpur Khas District Sindh, Pakistan. It is the second largest town of mirpurkhas district,

Geography
Digri is connected to several towns by main roads:
 Tando Ghulam Ali Road 
 Tando Bhago Road 
 Mipurkhas Road 
 Jamsebad Road 
 Tando Jan Mohammaad Road

Communities 
Digri is a culturally diverse town. As the small town has grown rapidly in the last few decades, the diversity has also increased with Muhajir Urdu Speaking, Sindhi, Rajpoots, QaimKhani, Baloch, Punjabi, and Pashtoons living there. 60% of the population of Digri are Sindhi people. The most common languages in the town are Sindhi,, Urdu. Since the city is made on ancestral land of Talpurs, from the beginning Talpurs were in control of the town committee.

Digri is Represented by the Pakistan People's Party, Mir Tariq Talpur (Current Member of Provincial Assembly).

Economy 

Livestock and poultry rearing, agricultural farms, and transportation are the main sources of income, while more than 20% population rely on government and private jobs. A sugar mill, Digri Sugar Mills, provides further job opportunities for local people.

References

External links
 Find Distance
 Population of Dhigri 
 Complete map of the city
 https://www.facebook.com/pages/Digri-city/367347073786

Populated places in Sindh
Mirpur Khas District
Talukas of Sindh